UCD won the 2002 Dublin Senior Football Championship.

References

External links
 Official Dublin Website
 Dublin on Hoganstand
 Dublin Club GAA
 Reservoir Dubs
 Dublin Teams

Dublin Senior Football Championship
Dublin Senior Football Championship